Le National may refer to:

Newspapers
 Le National (Paris), France, 1830–1851
 Le National (Québec), Canada
 Le National (Abidjan), Côte d'Ivoire
 Le National (Port-au-Prince), Haiti, weekly 1953–
 Le National (Lubumbashi), Democratic Republic of the Congo, weekly 1960–

Other
 Le National (TV series), Canadian